BBC Hausa is the Hausa language service of BBC World Service meant primarily for the Hausa-speaking world in  Nigeria, Ghana, Niger and the rest of Hausa speakers in West Africa. It is part of BBC foreign language output of 33 languages, of which five are African languages. The language service include radio station, Abuja bureau office and daily updated website 
which serves as a news portal and provides information as well as analyses in text, audio and video and provides online access to radio broadcasts. The radio service is broadcast from Broadcasting House in London and preliminary editing done at BBC bureau office in Abuja.

History
BBC Hausa service was the first African language service begun by BBC and is one of the five African languages it broadcasts. The service was launched on 13 March 1957, at 0930 GMT with a 15-minute programme under BBC World Service presented by Aminu Abdullahi Malumfashi. Later, a translated version was read by Abubakar Tunau in the programme West Africa in the News. The programmae was then aired on Wednesdays and Fridays only. Daily programme started one year later on 1 June 1958 and continuously run since then.
In March 2017, the BBC celebrated its Hausa service 60th Anniversary in Abuja. The director of the BBC World Service Group, Fran Unsworth attended. She said in part:  Nigerian President, Muhammadu Buhari also sent a voice message at the occasion where he made known that he is BBC Hausa loyal listener and has spent many years listening its programmes.

In its early days BBC rose to prominence in Hausa speaking world due to style of its reporting. It has conducted interviews with many prominent African politicians.

Abuja office
BBC Abuja office was opened in 2002.

Broadcasting
At many times BBC Hausa service have senior editor, producers, assistant editor and senior reporter. There are also stringers in key Nigerian cities such as Kaduna, Kano, Jos, Enugu, Abuja and Sokoto as well as stringers in Niger republic, Ghana and the People's Republic of China.

Broadcast by FM Radio stations in Nigeria
Many BBC Programme are rebroadcast by Nigerian media houses both radio and television through special partnership with the BBC World Service, these include the following media house: 
Yola, Adamawa State Radio Gotel - 917 kHz AM
Maiduguri,  Borno State BRTV - 94.5FM 
Kano, Kano State Freedom Radio - 99.5FM 
Dutse, Jigawa State Freedom Radio - 99.5FM
Kaduna, Kaduna State Freedom Radio - 99.5FM 
Jos, Plateau State PRTV - 88.65 FM, 92.1 FM, 90.5 FM, and 1313 kHz AM
Sokoto, Sokoto State Rima Radio - 97.1FM, 540 kHz AM

Online presence

With the advent of digital means of communication, listening to traditional radio set have been steadily declining since the 1990s. 
BBC Hausa radio reaches around 17.7 million people every week and the website bbchausa.com is among the most visited websites in Nigeria.

Perception of the service
A 2010 research report by the BBC Trust found that there is "a wide distrust of local media in the Hausa speaking regions of Africa where locals perceive local broadcasters and journalists as open to manipulation."

See also 

BBC Urdu
BBC Persian
BBC Bangla
BBC Somali

References

External links 

Research on the BBC Hausa Service 

Hausa service
Radio stations established in 1957